Helgö is an island in Ekerö Municipality in Stockholm County, Sweden. Helgö is an island situated in Lake Mälaren.

Excavations at Helgö

The island is perhaps best known for a major archaeological area.  The  old trading town on Helgö began to emerge around the year 200 AD, 500 years before Birka at Björkö. The first archaeological dig in 1954 uncovered the remains of the early settlement, including a workshop area which attracted international interest. The most notable finds included a small Buddha statuette from North India and a christening scoop from Egypt, both dating from the 6th century. The Indian Buddha statuette, the Irish crozier and the Egyptian Coptic scoop which were found on Helgö, are presently on display in the Swedish History Museum in Stockholm.

Kaggeholm Castle 

The site where Kaggeholm Castle (Kaggeholms slott) is located was first mentioned in a land title document in 1287.  During the 1500s the farm was owned by members of the families Grip and Bååt.

In 1647, Count Lars Kagg (1595–1661) acquired an estate which he named Kaggeholm. Kagg was a political ally of King Gustavus Adolphus, a member of the Privy Council of Sweden and Field Marshal during the Thirty Years' War.

The château-style manor house was built in 1725 after drawings and designs by Baroque architect Nicodemus Tessin the Younger (1654–1728).

Since 1939 it had been owned by the Swedish Pentecostal movement and is used as a training center by nearby Kaggeholm College (Kaggeholms folkhögskola).

Today Kaggeholm  is operated as a conference center  managed by the Swedish property development company Sisyfosgruppen Holding.

Royal Swedish Academy volumes
The findings from the excavations at Helgö have been reported in a series of volumes published by the Royal Swedish Academy of Letters, History and Antiquities, beginning with Volume 1 covering the period 1954–1956. Volume 18, the final volume in the series, was published in 2011.

Images

See also
List of islands of Sweden

References

Further reading
Gyllensvärd, Bo (2008) Excavations at Helgö XVII Exotic & Sacral Finds from Helgö (Almqvist & Wiksell)

External links
Kaggeholm website
Wikimapia

Archaeological sites in Sweden
Islands of Mälaren
Viking Age populated places
Former populated places in Sweden
Vendel Period